Tyrone Lamont Nesby (born January 31, 1976) is an American retired professional basketball player.

Nesby went to Cairo High School in Cairo, Illinois. He played collegiately at Vincennes University (1994–1996), and at UNLV (1996–1998). After being undrafted in the 1998 NBA draft, Nesby started his career by signing with Sioux Falls Skyforce of the Continental Basketball Association (CBA). He was asked to join the Los Angeles Clippers' training camp after playing successfully in the CBA, and later signed with them, where he averaged 10.1 points per game in his rookie season. He played two years with the Clippers before being traded to the Washington Wizards during the 2000–01 season until the end of the 2001–02 season. After his stint in the NBA he went to Europe, where he played for Olympia Larissa, Metis Varese, Reflex Belgrade, and Lietuvos rytas Vilnius. Nesby finished his career by playing for the Las Vegas Venom of the American Basketball Association (ABA).  On April 13, 2017, Nesby became the head basketball coach at Muhlenberg (PA) High School. On February 28, 2020 Nesby coached the Muhlenberg (Pa) High School basketball team to the Piaa District 3 5A Championship at the Giant Center in Hershey, Pa

References

External links
 Tyrone Nesby at legabasket.it
 NBA.com: Tyrone Nesby Player Info
 Tyrone Nesby NBA & ABA Statistics at Basketball-Reference.com
 

1976 births
Living people
American expatriate basketball people in Greece
American expatriate basketball people in Italy
American expatriate basketball people in Lithuania
American expatriate basketball people in Serbia
American men's basketball players
Basketball players from Illinois
BC Rytas players
Greek Basket League players
KK FMP (1991–2011) players
Los Angeles Clippers players
Olympia Larissa B.C. players
Pallacanestro Varese players
Parade High School All-Americans (boys' basketball)
People from Cairo, Illinois
Shooting guards
Sioux Falls Skyforce (CBA) players
Small forwards
Undrafted National Basketball Association players
UNLV Runnin' Rebels basketball players
Vincennes Trailblazers men's basketball players
Washington Wizards players